Patzig is a municipality, located on the island of Rügen, in the Vorpommern-Rügen district, in Mecklenburg-Vorpommern, Germany.

References

External links
Official website of Patzig

Towns and villages on Rügen